Gerkhu may refer to:
Gerkhu, Dhading
Gerkhu, Nuwakot